Have a Marijuana is the debut album of David Peel & The Lower East Side, released by Elektra Records in 1968.

Track listing 
All songs written by David Peel, except "I Like Marijuana" co-written with Cliff Goldsmith, Fred Smith, Marty Cooper and H. B. Barnum

Personnel 
Larry Adam – 12-string guitar
Harold C. Black – tambourine
George Cori – washtub bass
David Peel – vocals, guitar, harmonica
Billy Joe White – 12-string guitar
Dean White - [stadium horn]

Chart positions

References

External links 

1968 debut albums
1968 live albums
David Peel (musician) albums
Elektra Records live albums
Cannabis music
1968 in cannabis